Varna Mall is a shopping mall in Varna, Bulgaria, which was opened on June 12, 2008. It is located on the intersection of the Boulevards Vladislav Varnenchik & Hristo Smirnenski and it was built at a cost of € 120 million. Mall Varna's construction took two years.

The mall has:
  total built-up area
  total shopping area
  Indoor Market 
 2 floors with fashion shops (including Kenvelo, New Yorker, Nike, Adidas, Puma, Camper, Lee Cooper, Esprit, Le Coq Sportif & more.)
 8 cinema halls with 1300 seats Cinema Complex Arena
 Restaurants, coffee shops and chains including Kentucky Fried Chicken and Subway.
  Children entertainment center Capella Play

References

External links
Official website
Miller Developments official website

Buildings and structures in Varna, Bulgaria
Shopping malls in Bulgaria
Tourist attractions in Varna, Bulgaria
Economy of Varna, Bulgaria